The 1958 Campeonato Paulista da Primeira Divisão, organized by the Federação Paulista de Futebol, was the 57th season of São Paulo's top professional football league. Santos won the title for the 4th time. Ypiranga was relegated and the top scorer was Santos's Pelé with 58 goals.

Championship
The championship was disputed in a double-round robin system, with the team with the most points winning the title and the team with the fewest points being relegated.

Top Scores

References 

Campeonato Paulista seasons
Paulista